Cape Martyan Reserve is an IUCN Category – Ia (Strict nature reserve). It situated in Crimea, near the city of Yalta. It is also situated near the Nikitsky Botanical Gardens, which is where most of the scientific research on plants is conducted in Ukraine. The reserve was created to save naturally valuable systems of Cape Martyan in natural state, to protect and to preserve rare species of flora and fauna, and to conduct scientific research.

History
This reserve was established in 1973 by the decree of The Council of Ministers of the Ukrainian Soviet Socialist Republic of February 20, 1973 No. 84 on lands Nikitsky botanical garden.

Geography
The area of allocation reserve is a region of complex and lengthy geological processes related with the deposition of sedimentary rocks (mostly of limestone) and with the raising of the crust. As a result, fragments of limestone from Nikita's chain broke away and dropped into the sea and formed Cape Martyan. In orography this is a trail that is dissected by gullies, that stretch from Nikita's chain and dropped into the sea in some places (up to ).

Climate

Summers are hot and dry, and winters are mild and wet.

Environment
Here were saved typical natural landscapes and rich genetic fund of flora and fauna of Mediterranean type. This is due to the fact that the reserve is located on the northern boundary of Mediterranean floristic region. The aquatoria of the reserve is one of a few areas that were saved on the southern coast of Crimea in natural state, with a typical demersal flora.

Flora
The vegetation of the reserve is typical for Crimea Mediterranean community. Generally vegetation are composed of forests, most of which are presented by Downy Oak (Quercus pubescens) and, less - Greek Juniper (Juniperus excelsa) and very small - Pinus nigra. Warm climate and sufficient rainfall contribute to the spread in their unique in Crimea evergreen leaf tree - Greek Strawberry Tree (Arbutus andrachne) and shrubberies: Cistus tauricus, Ruscus aculeatus, Hedera taurica.

Important Bird Area
The reserve has been designated an Important Bird Area (IBA) by BirdLife International because it supports a population of great cormorants on migration.

References

External links
 Relic Vegetation of Cape Martyan Reserve
 Информация на сайта Украина Инкогнита
 Заповедники Крыма
 Государственный заповедник «Мыс Мартьян»
 Заповедник «Мыс Мартьян», Ялта

Tourist attractions in Crimea
1973 establishments in the Soviet Union
Nature reserves in Russia
Nature reserves in Ukraine
Protected areas established in 1973
Important Bird Areas of Ukraine